Mastermind School is a British-curriculum private school in Bangladesh established in 1997. It offers English-medium education to students from Play Group age to grade 12, leading to the International General Certificate of Secondary Education (under Edexcel) or GCE Ordinary Level (under Cambridge) and General Certificate of Education A-Level examinations, held under the Edexcel and Cambridge examination board.

The main buildings are located in Dhanmondi, with a branch in Uttara.

The school's principal is Syed Fakruddin Ahmed, who in the past years, doubled as the senior physics teacher. It consists of over 3200 students and 300 teaching staff. It has a debating society, a sports club, a newsletter club, and a community service club.
It runs on the British curriculum (GCE). Mastermind School won "The Most Versatile School" award in 2011 and 2015, and was the Champion of the junior category in 2015 at the Biotechnology Fest, Hosted by City Montessori School, in Lucknow, India.

Mastermind School provides extra-curricular activities of debating, community service, and sports. The school clubs are run by an executive committee, selected for each club.

Every year the Mastermind Community Service Club takes part in charitable works, including charity food sales, paying visits at Ashiq Foundation (a rehabilitation centre for under-privileged cancer-affected children), collection of winter clothes for charity distribution, a blood donation camp and art competition for autistic children.

Controversies 
The school was accused by the newspaper Daily Star of excessive use of corporal punishment. In April 2011, then vice-principal Neera Habib was said to have physically assaulted seven students for protesting against the expulsion of their friends. The vice principal was also said to have assaulted other students previously for straying off of the strict dress code. She was later fired without an official announcement from the school itself. Ahmede Hussain, then an English teacher of this school and affiliated with the Daily Star newspaper, left Mastermind after the publication of this news.

References

External links
 Official website

Dhanmondi
Schools in Dhaka District
Cambridge schools in Bangladesh